Doto alidrisi is a species of sea slug, a nudibranch, a marine gastropod mollusc in the family Dotidae.

Distribution
This species was described from Ceuta, an autonomous city of Spain on the north coast of Africa, at the entrance to the Mediterranean Sea.

Description
The body of this nudibranch is mostly translucent white in colour, with fine mottling of black along the middle of the back and the sides of the body. The ceratal tubercles are unusually elongate with the terminal tubercle being one third of the length of the entire ceras.

Ecology
The diet of Doto alidrisi'' is currently unknown.

References

Dotidae
Gastropods described in 2010